Saul William Marsch (born Saul George Mariaschin; August 10, 1924 – December 20, 1990) was an American professional basketball player. He played college basketball at Syracuse University for one season in 1942–43 before leaving to join the United States Navy during World War II. He played his final two years of college basketball at Harvard University, and helped to take the team to its first appearance in the NCAA tournament after achieving a 19-1 record. It would be the only time Harvard would reach the tournament for 66 years, until the 2011–12 team reached the Second Round in 2012.

Mariaschin was selected in the 1947 BAA draft by the Washington Capitols, but never played for the team. He instead signed with the Boston Celtics, and played for the team during the 1947–48 season. Mariaschin was the first and only player from Harvard to reach the BAA/NBA postseason until Jeremy Lin did so with the Houston Rockets in 2013.

Mariaschin died in 1990 during a skiing vacation.

BAA career statistics

Regular season

Playoffs

References

1924 births
1990 deaths
American men's basketball players
Basketball players from New York City
Boston Celtics players
Guards (basketball)
Harvard Crimson baseball players
Harvard Crimson men's basketball players
Sportspeople from Brooklyn
Syracuse Orange men's basketball players
Washington Capitols draft picks
United States Navy personnel of World War II